Max James Harris (born 14 September 1999) is an English professional footballer who plays as a goalkeeper for Bath City on loan from  club Cheltenham Town.

Career

Hereford
Harris was born in Gloucester, and started his career in the youth systems at Pegasus Juniors and Hereford. Whilst with Hereford, he made 3 appearances for the first team - two of these in the Herefordshire FA Challenge Cup, with a debut against Holme Lacy and his final appearance being his Southern League Division One South and West debut against Barnstaple Town He also spent time on loan at Lydney Town in 2017.

Oxford United
He joined Oxford United on a two-year scholarship in 2017. He spent time on loan at A.F.C. Totton.

He signed his first professional contract with Oxford United in July 2019.

On 3 January 2020, Harris joined National League South side Oxford City on a month-long loan. He appeared in four league matches for Oxford City.

He combined his time at Oxford United with studying at Hartpury University, and he captained the England Colleges team.

Cheltenham Town
Following a trial with the club, in September 2020 Harris signed for League Two side Cheltenham Town after his contract at Oxford United expired. He made his debut for Cheltenham Town on 6 October 2020 as a half-time substitute for Scott Flinders in a 2–0 EFL Trophy victory over Plymouth Argyle.

He signed a new contract with Cheltenham in May 2021. Ahead of the 2021–22 season he appeared in pre-season friendlies for Bishop's Cleeve and Stourbridge. During the season he spent time on loan at Cinderford Town, Redditch United and Weston-super-Mare. Harris returned to Weston-super-Mare on loan for the 2022–23 season.

He moved on loan to Bath City in January 2023, after being recalled from his loan with Weston.

References

External links
 

1999 births
Living people
English footballers
Footballers from Gloucester
Association football goalkeepers
Hereford Pegasus F.C. players
Hereford F.C. players
Lydney Town A.F.C. players
Oxford United F.C. players
A.F.C. Totton players
Oxford City F.C. players
Cheltenham Town F.C. players
Cinderford Town A.F.C. players
Redditch United F.C. players
Weston-super-Mare A.F.C. players
National League (English football) players
Southern Football League players
Bath City F.C. players